"Anchorage" is the debut single of American singer-songwriter Michelle Shocked, released as the lead single from her first studio album, Short Sharp Shocked (1988), in September 1988. The song peaked at number 66 on the US Billboard Hot 100 and also charted in Australia, Canada, and the United Kingdom, reaching the top 75 in these countries.

Lyrical content
The song is about the singer finally taking time out to write to an old friend who has moved from Texas to Anchorage, Alaska, and her friend's reply. In her reply, her friend realizes she might have become a housewife "anchored down in Anchorage" but still dreaming about being a "skateboard punk rocker in New York". She tells the singer that her husband Leroy says "send a picture", "hello", and "keep on rocking".

Much of the song's lyrics were taken directly from a letter from JoAnn Kelli Bingham, a Comanche Indian and recently married friend who had recently moved to geographically remote Alaska. Her husband is Leroy Bingham, a Blackfeet Indian who worked for Cook Inlet Tribal Council.

Track listings

US and Australian 7-inch single
A. "Anchorage" – 3:21
B. "Anchorage" (live) – 4:14

UK 10-inch and CD single
 "Anchorage"
 "Fogtown"
 "Penny Evans" (live at Glastonbury)
 "Re-Modelling the Pentagon" (live at Glastonbury)

UK 7-inch single
A. "Anchorage"
B. "Fogtown"

UK 12-inch single
A1. "Anchorage"
A2. "Strawberry Jam" (live at Glastonbury)
B1. "Fogtown" (from Texas Campfire L.P.)
B2. "Fogtown"

Charts

References

External links
 collected remarks of Michelle Shocked about Anchorage on "Graffiti Limbo, an unofficial Michelle Shocked site"
 Interpretation by Tony Shaw

1988 debut singles
1988 songs
Mercury Records singles
Michelle Shocked songs
Songs about Alaska
Songs about cities in the United States